Martin Blank (born August 29, 1962), is an American glass artist. He received a BFA degree from the Rhode Island School of Design in 1984 with a major in glass.  He studied with Dale Chihuly and by the 1990s was working independently.  Blank has taught at Pilchuck Glass School in Stanwood, Washington and Pratt Fine Arts Center in Seattle, Washington.  He lives and works in Seattle. 

Martin Blank is known for both figurative sculptures and architectural glass installations. Drinking from the Cup #2, in the collection of the Honolulu Museum of Art, is typical of the artist's figurative work, which usually represents the human body in blown glass.  The Corning Museum of Glass (Corning, New York), the Honolulu Museum of Art (Hawaii), the Krannert Art Museum (Champaign, Illinois), the Mary & Leigh Bloch Museum of Art (Northwestern University, Evanston, Illinois), the Millennium Museum (Beijing, China), the Montreal Museum of Fine Arts (Montreal, Canada), the Museum of Contemporary Art, Lake Worth, Florida, the Museum of Fine Arts, Boston, Palm Beach Community College Museum (Palm Beach, Florida), the Shanghai Museum of Fine Art (China), and the Tampa Museum of Art (Tampa, Florida) are among the public collections holding glass sculptures by Martin Blank.

References

 Americans & Glass, American Style, 1997, p. 28.
 Arts and Antiques, Summer 1996, pp. 32–38.
 Blowers of the Pacific NW, Glasswork, March 1992.
 Formed of Earth and Fire, Hawaiian Island Home, November 1992.
 Urban Glass Quarterly, #63, Summer 1996, p. 52.
 Glass & Architecture, New Glass, January 1997, p. 15.
 Profiles, Life Magazine, September 1994, p. 171.

External links
 Martin Blank Studio
 Martin Blank on ArtNet

1962 births
American glass artists
Living people
Pacific Northwest artists
Artists from Seattle
Rhode Island School of Design alumni
Sculptors from Washington (state)